"Count On Me" is a song by American singer-songwriter Bruno Mars from his debut studio album, Doo-Wops & Hooligans (2010). The song was first unveiled on Mars's debut extended play, It's Better If You Don't Understand (2010). It was released as a radio single in Australia and served as the overall sixth single from Doo-Wops & Hooligans, being serviced to contemporary hit radio and adult contemporary radio in on November 7, 2011. It was composed by Mars, Philip Lawrence, and Ari Levine, under their alias, the Smeezingtons. Musically, "Count On Me" is a folk and tropical record that lyrically details the importance of friendship and conveys a positive message.

The song received generally positive to mixed reviews. Some music critics noted the resemblance to "Over the Rainbow" by Israel Kamakawiwoʻole, praising its arrangement and "uplifting" vibe, others criticized its "saccharine sound" and cheesy lyrics. The single peaked at number two in the Czech Republic and it was able to reach the position of 19 in Australia and 13 in New Zealand. It was certified three platinum by the Australian Recording Industry Association (ARIA) and the Recording Industry Association of America (RIAA), respectively. Mars performed "Count on Me" on television shows such as The Ellen DeGeneres Show and included it on The Doo-Wops & Hooligans Tour (2010–12), the Hooligans in Wondaland Tour (2011), and once on the Moonshine Jungle Tour (2013–14). It has been covered a number of times and has been used in a couple of commercials.

Production and release
"Count On Me" was first recorded by Bruno Mars for his debut EP, It's Better If You Don't Understand, which was released on May 11, 2010, under Elektra Records. It was written by Mars, Philip Lawrence and Ari Levine, while production was handled by the same three under their alias, the Smeezingtons. Levine was responsible for engineering the song, which he did at Levcon Studios in Los Angeles. Levine and Mars played and recorded all of the instruments on the track. The single was mixed by Manny Marroquin and assistants Christian Plata and Erik Madrid at Larrabee Recording Studios in Los Angeles, California. It was mastered by Stephen Marcussen at Marcussen Mastering in Hollywood, California. "Count on Me" was issued to contemporary hit radio and adult contemporary radio on November 7, 2011, in Australia by Atlantic Records and Warner Music Australia as a single.

Composition

"Count On Me" has been labelled as a folk by reviewer Pete Rivas from The AU Review and as tropical song by critic Bill Lamb from ThoughtCo (former About.com). The Scotsman found it to be influenced by reggae. It features a laid back groove and tropical vibes, resembling Mars's "Hawaiian background." An acoustic guitar and "beach-bound bongos" are part of its instrumentation. According to the sheet music, the song is composed in the key of C major with a time signature in common time, and a moderate groove of 88 beats per minute. Mars's vocals range spans from G4 to the high note C6.

AllMusic's Tim Sendra described the song as a "bittersweet ballad", while Katie Hasty from HitFix classified it as a "sandy-sweet tune". It draws musical elements from the works of Jason Mraz, Jack Johnson and David Cook. MTV UK Joanne Dorken and Eric Henderson of Slant Magazine said that the recording's sound was "reminiscent" of  "Over The Rainbow" (1993) by Israel Kamakawiwoʻole. It conveys the message of comfort found in a friend and being present for those who are important in your life.

Critical reception 
"Count On Me" received generally positive reviews from most music critics. Pete Rivas of The AU Review gave the song a 7 out of 10 saying that it is an "uplifting and chilled sounds" and that it "hits all the right spots". Rivas found the lyrics to convey a "nice" and "positive" message, adding that the single "shows some similarities with his other singles but not to much detriment". The Boston Globe critic Ken Capobianco exalted Mars's vocals on the recording as "one of his best" on the album. While reviewing Mars's debut EP, It's Better If You Don't Understand, Bill Lamb of About.com stated that "there is a dreamy wistfulness here that is irresistible, regarding "Count On Me". He added, that the song is "perfect for summer days". However, while reviewing the parent album, Tim Sendra from AllMusic found that the song lacked deepness and that "it's not poetry". Nevertheless, Sendra did say that the track is "sweetly played and sung" and is able to "project a cuddly image and will melt hearts".

On the other hand, Nows Kevin Ritchie criticized the song for its "cutesy lyrics" and "insipid rhymes like "You can count on me like one, two, three". He added that the song doesn't contribute for the album cohesion, but add for a "no-brainer radio references to Coldplay, U2, Michael Jackson, Sade, Feist and so on". Alexis Petridis of The Guardian concurred with the latter on the "saccharine sound" and explained that during the recording "you start to boggle that Britain's teens are being fed something so sugary without Jamie Oliver getting a campaign up about it".

Commercial performance
In New Zealand, "Count on Me" spent two weeks at its peak position of 13, after debuting at number 21 on August 29, 2011. It was awarded a platinum plaque by Recorded Music NZ (RIANZ). The single first appeared on the UK Singles Chart on September 24, 2011, peaking at number 78 on the following week. It was able to spend four weeks on the chart and was certified platinum by the British Phonographic Industry (BPI). In 2012, the song debuted at the Ö3 Austria Top 40 at number 15, peaking at number five on the following week. It was able to spend 14 weeks on the chart and it ended up being certified gold. "Count On Me" debuted on Switzerland on the issue date of June 24, 2012, spending six weeks on the chart and peaking at number 55.

"Count on Me" debuted in Australia on December 11, 2012, at number 41, peaking at number 19 four weeks after its debut. It was the eleventh most played song in the Australian radio in 2012 and was certified three times platinum by the Australian Recording Industry Association (ARIA). In 2013, it peaked at number seven on the Spanish Singles Chart and left the charts after two weeks. Despite never charting at German Top 100, the track reached the top position of the German airplay chart and was certified gold by the Bundesverband Musikindustrie (BVMI). It was certified three times platinum by the Recording Industry Association of America (RIAA), despite never being promoted as a single in the US. In 2020, the song entered the Scottish Singles Chart for the first time, peaking at number 21.

Live performances
In September 2010, "Count on Me" was performed in front of a small crowd of fans at the Waterloo Records in Austin, Texas. Mars sung live the song on September 27, 2010, during a MTV Push Live session held in the United Kingdom. Mars, who was the opening act in an episode of The Ellen DeGeneres Show in December 2012, performed the track as a tribute to the victims of the shooting in Newtown, Connecticut. It was the ninth song of his debut world tour, The Doo-Wops & Hooligans Tour (2010) and on the Hooligans in Wondaland Tour (2011). It was performed only once during the Moonshine Jungle Tour (2013–2014) in Jakarta.

Cover versions and usage in media
"Count on Me" has been covered by British child singer Connie Talbot and included on her album Beautiful World (2012). South Korean artists Lee Ki-chan and G.NA released a cover of the song as a CD single on May 12, 2011. The CD single, also includes an acoustic version, instrumental version and acoustic instrumental version of the track. It was sung live by 5,000 children from the Voice in a Million Choir at the Wembley Arena. In 2015, Olivia Holt performed a cover of the song on the series finale of I Didn't Do It. It was also covered by the Willis Family for the first episode of the second season of their show by the same name, aired by TLC. In 2020, American singer-songwriter Josie Dunne and Australian singer-songwriter Wafia covered "Count On Me", in different instances, as part of the tenth anniversary of Mars's debut album.

The recording is part of the Belgian/American animated film A Turtle's Tale: Sammy's Adventures and the TV show Suburgatory. It has been featured on two different commercials for the Blue Cross Blue Shield Association, both took place one in Illinois. and was used for a Hyundai 's commercial, during the Super Bowl XLVIII’s fourth quarter, entitled "Dad's Sixth Sense", that featured the 2016 Hyundai Genesis and Mars's song. It was chosen "for reasons separate and coincidental from Mars' previously announced Half Time gig". The track was included on the Songs for the Philippines relief album, which was compiled to help the victims of Typhoon Haiyan since "all proceeds" were donated to the Philippine Red Cross.
It is featured in the film, Diary of a Wimpy Kid: The Long Haul (2017) and on a commercial for Ferrero SpA. The song is also featured in the official trailer for the 2021 film, Tom & Jerry.

Personnel
Credits adapted from the liner notes of Doo-Wops & Hooligans, Elektra Records:

Bruno Mars – lead vocals, songwriting, instrumentation
Philip Lawrence – songwriting
Ari Levine – songwriting, instrumentation, engineering
The Smeezingtons – production
Manny Marroquin – mixing
Erik Madrid – mixing assistant
Christian Plata – mixing assistant 
Stephen Marcussen – mastering

Charts

Weekly charts

Year-end charts

Certifications

Release history

References 

2010 songs
2011 singles
2010s ballads
Bruno Mars songs
American folk songs
Folk ballads
Song recordings produced by the Smeezingtons
Songs written by Bruno Mars
Songs written by Philip Lawrence (songwriter)
Songs written by Ari Levine
Atlantic Records singles
Elektra Records singles
Songs about friendship
Tropical songs